Bascot de Mauléon was a Basque soldier, mercenary and Brigand of the Hundred Years' War in the 14th century.

In 1363, after the Treaty of Brétigny, Bascot de Mauléon and his men began to pillage the countryside. His was one of the many so called  Tard-Venus, groups of mercenaries left without employment by the end of hostilities.

His troops attacked Avignon and ransomed the Pope. They then plundered Burgundy. He took part in the Battle of Brignais where troops raised by the king were routed due to the betrayal of the Archpriest.

Froissart tells the story that Mauléon had a lady love in Anse. However, another Bandit leader named Limousin also obtained the favors of this beautiful woman. The chronicle recounts that Mauléon attacked Limousin (caught in the Act) who fled the city naked. Limousin; however, latter ambushed, Mauléon on 2 May 1365.

References

People of the Hundred Years' War
French soldiers
French mercenaries
Year of birth unknown
French prisoners of war in the Hundred Years' War
Hundred Years' War
Medieval mercenaries
14th century in France